Information processing is the change (processing) of information in any manner detectable by an observer. 

Information processing may also refer to:

 Data processing in computer science